Chiang Muan is a district (amphoe) in the southern part of Phayao province, northern Thailand.

History
Chiang Mun was originally part of the District Ban Muang of Chiang Rai province (which was later renamed Pong district). On 12 May 1969, the minor district (king amphoe) Chiang Mun was established as a subordinate of Pong district, consisting of the two tambons Chiang Muan and Sa. The third sub-district Ban Mang was established in 1970.

On 1 April 1974, it was upgraded to a full district and, in 1977, it was added to newly established Phayao Province.

Geography
Neighboring districts are (from the west clockwise): Dok Khamtai and Pong of Phayao Province; Ban Luang of Nan province; and Song of Phrae province.

The Phi Pan Nam Mountains dominate the landscape of the district. The Yom River, which has its sources in the range, is an important water resource. Doi Phu Nang National Park is in Chiang Muan District.

Administration

Central administration 
Chiang Muan is divided into three sub-districts (tambons), which are further subdivided into 34 administrative villages (mubans).

Local administration 
There is one sub-district municipality (thesaban tambon) in the district:
 Chiang Muan consisting of sub-district Chiang Muan and parts of sub-district Ban Mang.

There are two sub-district administrative organizations (SAO) in the district:
 Ban Mang consisting of parts of sub-district Ban Mang.
 Sa consisting of sub-district Sa.

References

External links
amphoe.com
Doi Phu Nang National Park

Chiang Muan